Al-Nida' ('The Call') was a newspaper published from Kuwait City during the Iraqi occupation 1990-1991.

In August 1990 the Iraqi authorities shut down the al-Qabas newspaper and founded al-Nida using the requisitioned facilities of al-Qabas. Al-Nida''' was the sole newspaper published in Kuwait during this period. It was distributed for free in Kuwait. It was also sold in Jordan. The newspaper carried speeches by Saddam Hussein and information of laws and decrees issues by the Iraqi authorities.

The newspaper was shut down on 1 January 1991, without any stated explanation. After the fall of Iraqi rule in Kuwait, 24 former employees of al-Nida'' were tried in Martial Law Court.

References

Mass media in Kuwait City
Arabic-language newspapers
Publications established in 1990
Publications disestablished in 1991
Defunct newspapers published in Kuwait
1990 establishments in Kuwait
1991 disestablishments in Kuwait